The Ouray Formation is a geologic formation in Colorado. It preserves fossils dating back to the Devonian period.

See also

 List of fossiliferous stratigraphic units in Colorado
 Paleontology in Colorado

References
 

Devonian Colorado
Devonian southern paleotropical deposits